Kenilworth Fort or Kenilworth Castle is situated in Hosur in the present day Krishnagiri district in the state of Tamil Nadu in India. Its architecture is based on that of Kenilworth Castle in England, making it probably the only fort in India built to resemble an English castle. Mr. Brett, the collector of Salem between 1859 and 1862, built this at his wife's request to be their residence, hence it is also sometimes called Brett's Fort. It was purchased by the government in 1875.

References

Forts in Tamil Nadu
Krishnagiri district